James Reid Lambdin (May 10, 1807 – 1889) was an American born artist, famous for many of his portraits of U.S. Presidents.

Life
Lambdin was born on May 10, 1807, in Pittsburgh, Pennsylvania. He later studied art in Philadelphia for two years (1823–25) under the tutelage of Thomas Sully. He is famous for his portraits of U.S. Presidents, including portraits of William Henry Harrison and Zachary Taylor. Lambdin became professor of fine arts at the University of Pennsylvania. He had one son, George C. Lambdin, born in 1830 in Pittsburgh. In 1839, he was elected into the National Academy of Design as an Honorary Academician.

References

External links 
Artwork by James Reid Lambdin

Gallery

1807 births
1889 deaths
Artists from Pittsburgh
19th-century American painters
19th-century American male artists
American male painters
University of Pennsylvania faculty
Painters from Pennsylvania
National Academy of Design members